A vascular malformation is a blood vessel or lymph vessel abnormality. Vascular malformations are one of the classifications of vascular anomalies, the other grouping is vascular tumors. They may cause aesthetic problems as they have a growth cycle, and can continue to grow throughout life.

Vascular malformations of the brain include those involving capillaries, and those involving the veins and arteries. Capillary malformations in the brain are known as cerebral cavernous malformations or capillary cavernous malformations. Those involving the mix of vessels are known as cerebral arteriovenous malformations (AVMs or cAVMs). The arteriovenous type is the most common in the brain.

Types
A simple division of the vascular malformations is made into low-flow and high-flow types. Low-flow malformations involve a single type of blood or lymph vessel, and are known as simple vascular malformations; high-flow malformations involve an artery. There are also malformations that are of mixed-flow involving more than one type of vessel, such as an arteriovenous malformation.

Low-flow vascular malformations include capillary malformations, venous malformations, and lymphatic malformations.

Capillary malformation

Capillary malformations involve the capillaries, and are the most common type. They used to refer only to port-wine stains but now include others. Capillary malformations are limited to the superficial layers of the skin but they can thicken, become nodular, and sometimes become disfiguring.
It has been proposed that the category of capillary malformations, also called vascular stains, be classified into seven major clinical types including nevus flammeus nuchae also known as nevus simplex, commonly known as stork bite or salmon patch.

A capillary malformation is also a feature of the disorder macrocephaly-capillary malformation.

Vascular anomalies
A vascular anomaly can be either a vascular tumor or a birthmark, or a vascular malformation. 
 In a tumor such as infantile hemangioma the mass is soft, and easily compressed, and their coloring is due to the dilated anomalous involved veins. They are most commonly found in the head and neck. Venous malformations are the type of vascular malformation that involves the veins. They can often extend deeper from their surface appearance, reaching underlying muscle or bone. In the neck they may extend into the lining of the mouth cavity or into the salivary glands. They are the most common of the vascular malformations. A severe venous malformation can involve the lymph vessels as a lymphaticovenous malformation.

Lymphatic malformation

Lymphatic malformations are congenital, developing from badly-formed lymphatic vessels in early embryonic development. Abnormal development of the lymph vessels results in their failure to connect and drain into the venous system.

These lymph vessels can become blocked due to the collection of lymph which forms a cyst as a mass, and are known as lymphangiomas. They can be macrocystic, microcystic, or a combination of the two. A macrocystic lymphangioma is also known as a cystic hygroma. Cystic hygromas most often occur in the neck where they are known as nuchal hygromas.

A severe venous malformation is known as a lymphaticovenous malformation that also involves the lymph vessels.

Arteriovenous malformation

Arteriovenous malformations occur between an artery and a vein.

In the brain a cerebral arteriovenous malformation causes arterial blood to be directly shunted into the veins as there is an absence of a capillary bed. This carries a high risk of an intracranial hemorrhage.

See also
 Arteriovenous fistula
 Lymphohemangioma
 Telangiectasia
 Vascular disease

References

Vascular diseases